Sofía Lecubarri Ruigómez (born 15 November 1993) known professionally as Sofia Ellar, is an Anglo-Spanish singer and songwriter. Born and raised for her first years in London, she started performing in various small singing concerts as a child in the early 2000s, when she moved to Madrid. She graduated from IE University with a degree in Business administration and has continued with her musical career ever since. Ellar is praised for her proximity to fans, notably visible in her concerts, where she can often be seen intimately surrounded by the audience.

Career
She has been host to numerous radio and television interviews, and has participated in various tours around Spain. As of September 2017, her videos on YouTube reached several million views and her tracks on Spotify, three million.

On 24 February 2017, her first album, Seis peniques, was released. Its first single, entitled Segundas partes entre suicidas, marked her entrance to Spotify.

In December 2017 Sofia Ellar announced that all the revenue obtained from her single, titled Humanidad en Paro, would be destined to different charities supporting homelessness.

Discography

Albums
 Seis peniques (2017)
 Nota en Do (2018)

Singles
 Verano con Lima (2017)
 Cenas que Acaban en Juerga (2017)

 Humanidad en Paro (2017)
 Tus Movidas (2018)
 Versión de Cobarde (2018)
 No Fue Mentira - Sesiones Moraima (2018)
 Bañarnos en Vaqueros (2019)
 Ahora Dime (2019)
 La Revolución (2019)
 Media Tinta (2019)
 Ana - ft. Ana (2019)
 Barrer a casa (2020)
 Si es roma Amor (2020)

Filmography
 The Angry Birds Movie 2 (2019)
Si yo fuera rico (2019)

Tours
 Bañarnos en Vaqueros Tour (2019)

References

External links

 Official website
 Official Spotify site
 Official Napster site

1993 births
English women singer-songwriters
English women pop singers
Singers from London
Living people
IE University alumni
Spanish women singer-songwriters
Spanish singer-songwriters
People educated at Hill House School
People educated at Woldingham School
21st-century English women singers
21st-century English singers
21st-century Spanish women singers
21st-century Spanish singers